Kim Gwang-chol (born 5 September 1969) is a North Korean wrestler. He competed in the men's freestyle 62 kg at the 1992 Summer Olympics.

References

External links
 

1969 births
Living people
North Korean male sport wrestlers
Olympic wrestlers of North Korea
Wrestlers at the 1992 Summer Olympics
Place of birth missing (living people)
20th-century North Korean people